Second Sight is a British television crime drama, principally written and created by Paula Milne, that first aired on BBC One on 9 January 2000. Originally broadcast a single two-part pilot, before being followed by a series of three two-part stories, Second Sight follows DCI Ross Tanner (Clive Owen), a maverick cop who finds out that he has a rare disease which is causing him to go blind. Tanner's boss, Superintendent Lawson (Thomas Wheatley), little suspects that the man he named to head the elite Specialist Elite Murder Unit is losing his sight. Tanner struggles keep his condition a secret, but soon asks himself – how long can he keep solving crimes that not even the fully sighted can fathom.

The series also follows Tanner's battles with his irrepressible Inspector, Catherine Tully (Claire Skinner), who urges him to tell the truth for the sake of his own health. Rebecca Egan also co-stars as Tanner's long-suffering wife, Marilyn; while Benjamin Smith appears as his son, Sam. 

The complete series was later released on DVD on 24 July 2006 via 2|Entertain.

Cast
 Clive Owen as DCI Ross Tanner
 Claire Skinner as DI Catherine Tully
 Selina Boyack as DC Tanya Holt
 Rupert Holliday-Evans as DS Robert Pewsey
 Mark Bazeley as DI Michael Boyd (series)
 Akbar Kurtha as DC Mohammad Chad (series)
 Frank Harper as DS Tommy Finch
 Alexander Morton as DS Eddie Julian
 Thomas Wheately as Supt Jim Lawson (series)
 Rebecca Egan as Marilyn Tanner
 Benjamin Smith as Sam Tanner

Episodes

Pilot (2000)

Series (2001)

References

External links
 

BBC television dramas
2000 British television series debuts
2001 British television series endings
2000s British drama television series
2000s British crime television series
Television series by Warner Bros. Television Studios